International Balkan University (ABBR. IBU) is a private, foundation-owned, not-for-profit university with headquarters in Skopje, North Macedonia. It was founded in 2006 by the Foundation for Education and Culture "ÜSKÜP".

Bachelor and master programs
The university offers bachelor and master programs at its seven faculties:
 Faculty of Engineering
 Faculty of Economics and Administrative Sciences
 Faculty of Communications
 Faculty of Art and Design
 Faculty of Humanities and Social Sciences
 Faculty of Education
 Faculty of Law

References

Education in Skopje
Educational institutions established in 2006
Universities in North Macedonia
2006 establishments in the Republic of Macedonia